Neil James Adams (born 23 November 1965) is an English former professional footballer and former manager of Norwich City. He played as a midfielder for Stoke City, Everton, Oldham Athletic and Norwich City. He is currently the Assistant Sporting Director for Norwich City, having previously held the role of Loans Manager since 2015.

Adams began his career playing for his local club Stoke City, where he quickly earned a reputation of being a tricky and productive winger. This prompted Everton to pay a fee of £150,000 for his signature in June 1986. He was part of the Everton's Championship-winning squad in 1987, but injuries prevented him from reaching his potential at Goodison Park and after three years he moved on to Oldham Athletic. At Oldham, Adams played a major role in helping the club gain promotion to the newly formed Premier League in 1992 and also helped the Latics to reach the 1990 League Cup Final. He signed for Norwich City in February 1994 for a fee of £250,000. He became a regular in the Norwich for the next six seasons before ending his playing career with another two years at Oldham. After retiring from playing, Adams became a pundit for BBC Radio Norfolk, before taking up a coaching role at the Norwich City Academy – guiding the U-18 team to victory in the 2012–13 FA Youth Cup. In April 2014 Adams was appointed first-team manager following the departure of Chris Hughton.

Playing career
Adams was born in Stoke-on-Trent and began his career with local side Stoke City making his professional debut against Coventry City in the Full Members Cup in 1985–86. He made a huge impression with his performances for Stoke in his debut season, with his attacking creativity and deadly accurate crossing ability earning him a call up to the England U21 side for their European Championship semi-final tie in Italy. With Stoke's finances poor and many top-flight sides showing an interest in signing him, he was sold to Everton in June 1986 for a fee of £150,000 after the Toffees beat off competition from Arsenal and Tottenham Hotspur, much to the annoyance to the Stoke supporters who feared that their club was becoming a 'selling club'.

In his first season at Everton he helped the side win the First Division title in 1986–87. During his three years on Merseyside he also won two Charity Shield medals and earned his first England U-21 cap in an away game against Sweden. In June 1989 he rejected the offer of a new contract at Goodison Park and joined Oldham Athletic in a £100,000 deal. The five seasons that Adams spent at Boundary Park was to coincide with the club's golden period. In 1990, he played for the Latics in the League Cup Final against Nottingham Forest, and the following season he helped the team win the Second Division title as Oldham won promotion to the newly formed Premier League.

Adams' contribution from the right flank helped Oldham establish themselves against the best sides in the country, and he was influential in helping the Latics maintain their top-flight status during their 1992–93 campaign by scoring 9 goals – including crucial strikes against Liverpool, Everton, Chelsea and most memorably the only goal in a 1–0 defeat of soon-to-be-crowned double winners, Manchester United.

Whilst at Oldham he also picked up a Carling No. 1 Award – selected by a Premiership committee before the start of the 1993–94 season. In early 1994 Norwich City made inquiries about acquiring his services, and after protracted negotiations between the two clubs he eventually signed for the Canaries for a fee of £250,000 in mid-February. Adams was to become a regular in the Norwich side during his time at Carrow Road. He assumed the role of penalty taker and dead ball specialist for the Canaries, and in his career he only missed from the spot once, in a league cup game against Swansea.

He started in all but one of Norwich's games during the 1996–97 campaign, and completed that season as the Canaries' second top-scorer with a total of 16 goals. In 2002, Norwich fans voted Adams into the Norwich City F.C. Hall of Fame. After leaving Norfolk in the summer of 1999, Adams returned to former club Oldham for two seasons before a cruciate knee injury forced him to retire.

Managerial career
A holder of the UEFA Pro-Licence, he returned to Norwich where was appointed as manager of the club's U-18s. Adams guided the side to victory over Chelsea in the 2012–13 FA Youth Cup. On 6 April 2014 he was appointed Norwich City first-team caretaker manager following the departure of Chris Hughton. On 22 May 2014 he was appointed permanent manager of Norwich City, signing a three-year contract. Adams resigned from his position on 5 January 2015. On 31 July 2015, Adams returned to Norwich City as Loan Player Manager,
 a role he fulfilled until September 2021 when he was promoted to Assistant Sporting Director.

Career statistics
Source:

A.  The "Other" column constitutes appearances and goals in the FA Charity Shield, Full Members Cup, Football League Trophy and Screen Sport Super Cup.

Managerial statistics

References
General
 

Specific

External links
 Career information at ex-canaries.co.uk
 

1965 births
Living people
Footballers from Stoke-on-Trent
English footballers
England under-21 international footballers
Association football midfielders
Stoke City F.C. players
Everton F.C. players
Oldham Athletic A.F.C. players
Norwich City F.C. players
Premier League players
English Football League players
English football managers
Norwich City F.C. managers
Premier League managers
English Football League managers